This is a list of instruments by Hornbostel-Sachs number, covering those instruments that are classified under 311.211 under that system. It includes instruments that are Stick zithers, musical bow cum stick, with rigid string carrier, curved flexible end, one attached resonator gourd.

These instruments may be classified with a suffix, based on how the strings are caused to vibrate.

4: Hammers or beaters
5: Bare hands and fingers
6: Plectrum
7: Bowing
71: Using a bow
72: Using a wheel
73: Using a ribbon
8: Keyboard
9: Using a mechanical drive

List

References

Notes

311.221
Gourd musical instruments